Khabazino is a rural locality (a selo) and the administrative center of Khabazinsky Selsoviet, Topchikhinsky District, Altai Krai, Russia. The population was 488 as of 2013. There are 7 streets.

Geography 
Khabazino is located 32 km southeast of Topchikha (the district's administrative centre) by road. Pokrovka is the nearest rural locality.

References 

Rural localities in Topchikhinsky District